is a Japanese freestyle skier. He competed in the men's moguls event at the 2002 Winter Olympics.

References

1982 births
Living people
Japanese male freestyle skiers
Olympic freestyle skiers of Japan
Freestyle skiers at the 2002 Winter Olympics
Sportspeople from Niigata Prefecture
Asian Games medalists in freestyle skiing
Freestyle skiers at the 2003 Asian Winter Games
Asian Games silver medalists for Japan
Medalists at the 2003 Asian Winter Games
21st-century Japanese people